Slip-Slop-Slap (originally Slip! Slop! Slap!) is a mnemonic slogan for reducing unhealthy sun exposure by slipping on a shirt or rash guard, slopping on sunblock, and slapping on a sun hat. It was prominent in Australia and New Zealand during the 1980s, originating as the jingle in a televised public service announcement in which an anthropomorphic mascot named Sid the Seagull would sing and dance to the phrase. 

The campaign, originally funded by public donations, was launched by Cancer Council Victoria in 1981 to combat high rates of skin cancer in Australia, and achieved high nationwide awareness over its original run. It was briefly and less successfully revived in 2010, with Sid the Seagull singing to a revised jingle "Slip, Slop, Slap, Seek and Slide", adding seeking shade and sliding on wraparound sunglasses to the advice. An alternate version known as "Slip, Slop, Slap and Wrap" was used in New Zealand, where the mascot was a tiger prawn named Tiger, voiced by Ants from What Now. Some Canadian cities have also started their own Slip-Slop-Slap campaigns. In Britain, it was featured in a BBC Breakfast report on 27 June 2011.

Effect on cancer rates 
Since this campaign was introduced along with advertisements and a jingle, the incidence of the two most common forms of skin cancer (basal-cell carcinoma and squamous cell carcinoma) in Australia has decreased. However, the incidence of melanoma, the most lethal form of skin cancer, has increased. However, statistical analysis from the Australian Government's Australian Institute of Health and Welfare found this increased incidence risk is almost entirely in the older (over-60 years) population, who lived the majority of their lives before the importance of sun safety was widely known, whereas the rate of incidence of melanoma by age 30 has consistently dropped from its peak in 1997, having halved in the time to 2020. Meanwhile, risk of melanoma incidence by age 60 has remained stable since 2011. An epidemiological study published in 2002 concluded that skin cancer increases could not be associated with the use of sun creams, and recommended continued use of the current campaigns as a means to reduce melanoma risk.

The experience of more than 25 years of skin cancer prevention in Australia shows broad-based multifaceted public education programs can improve a population's sun protective behaviors and reducing sunburn, a short-term marker of skin cancer risk. Furthermore, declining skin cancer incidence in younger cohorts and economic assessment show skin cancer prevention programs are an eminently worthwhile investment.

See also 
 Health effects of sun exposure
 Skin cancer in Australia

External links 
 Slop, Slap, Seek, Slide - Cancer Council (Australia)

 Slop, Slap and Wrap - SunSmart New Zealand

References 

Advertising campaigns
Australian advertising slogans
New Zealand advertising slogans
1981 neologisms
Australian slang
Sun tanning
Healthcare in Australia
Health campaigns